Alain Sergile (born February 15, 1972 ) is a Haitian swimmer who competed at the 1996 Summer Olympics in Atlanta, Georgia. He graduated from Southern Methodist University in 1994 where he was a member of the men's swimming and diving team. Sergile participated in the men's 100 meter butterfly, finishing with a time of 58.23 seconds. He did not advance to the finals.

References

Living people
1972 births
People from Roswell, Georgia
SMU Mustangs men's swimmers
Haitian male swimmers
Male butterfly swimmers
Olympic swimmers of Haiti
Swimmers at the 1996 Summer Olympics
Sportspeople from Fulton County, Georgia